Pierre Fresnay (4 April 1897 – 9 January 1975) was a French stage and film actor.

Biography
Born Pierre Jules Louis Laudenbach, he was encouraged by his uncle, actor Claude Garry, to pursue a career in theater and film. He joined the company at what later was the Théatre de Paris, only to shortly after at the Conservatoire, becoming a pensionnaire of the Comédie-Française in early 1915, returning to it after three years military service in 1919. Before his departure from the Comédie-Française in 1926 Fresnay had played 80 parts in Paris, excelling especially in the works of Alfred de Musset. After playing small roles, in 1915 he was engaged as a pensionnaire without taking an audition at the Comédie-Française, moving up to Mario in Le Jeu de l'amour et du hasard and the title role in Britannicus. After the armistice he appeared as Clitandre in Les Femmes savantes, as well as other juvenile leads. These included Perdican (On ne badine pas avec l'amour by Musset), Valentin (Il ne faut jurer de rien by Musset, which he also directed), Fortunio (Le Chandelier by Musset). Alongside contemporary creations, his Comédie-Française career continued with Chatterton (Vigny), becoming a valued member of the troupe due to his intelligent acting, the flexibility of his talent, and quality of his diction ("l'intelligence de son jeu, la souplesse de son talent et l'excellence de sa diction"). Upon leaving the Comédie-Française his stage work was found at the Variétés in Guitry plays, then as Marius in the Pagnol trilogy.

During the 1920s, Fresnay appeared in many popular stage productions. In 1927 Marion Fawcett was producing plays at the Theatre Royal in Huddersfield in her "International Masterpieces Seasons". She produced a play in which Fresnay delivered his lines in French. The play was "Game As He Played It".

He took the title role of Marcel Pagnol's Marius (1929), which ran for over 500 performances, also taking this role in the 1931 film adaptation of the play. He reprised the character in the next two parts of Marcel Pagnol's Marseilles Trilogy, Fanny (1932) and César (1936).

In 1932 Yvonne Printemps's marriage to Sacha Guitry broke up, and Printemps became Fresnay's personal and professional partner. 

He took over the lead role in Noël Coward's Conversation Piece when the author moved on in April 1934. Fresnay won excellent reviews, and his stage partnership with Printemps was greatly admired. In the same year Printemps and Fresnay had a screen hit in Abel Gance's La dame aux camélias. Between then and 1951 they appeared together in eight films.
In 1934 he appeared briefly in Alfred Hitchcock's first version of The Man Who Knew Too Much. In 1937, he portrayed the aristocratic French military officer Captain de Boeldieu in Jean Renoir's masterpiece La Grande Illusion.

In 1947, he played Vincent de Paul in Monsieur Vincent, for which he won the Volpi Cup for Best Actor at the Venice Film Festival. His portrayal was described in Sight and Sound as "one of the most perfect pieces of work to be seen for many years in any clime". He also portrayed Nobel Peace Prize laureate Albert Schweitzer in Il est minuit, Docteur Schweitzer (1952). La Valse de Paris gave Fresnay the chance to play in a "stylised musical" as a "delightful, lightly caricatured portrayal of Offenbach", alongside Printemps.

Soldier
A soldier in the French Army during World War I, he returned to his career a hero. However, under the German occupation of World War II, he worked for the Franco-German film company Continental, making Henri-Georges Clouzot's Le Corbeau and other films.

Fresnay's appearances in films produced by German film company Continental during the war, especially Le Corbeau, caused his summons, brief imprisonment, and condemnation by a purge tribunal after the liberation. Despite the parallels between the poison-pen letters in Le Corbeau (in which he played the leading role) and the widespread letters of denunciation in Occupied France, Clouzot's film was banned in France for more than 20 years.

Later years
Printemps and Fresnay starred in Oscar Straus's Drei Waltzer, given in French as Trois valses on the Parisian stage and on film (Les trois valses). The critic Richard Traubner commented in 2006 that because of the performances of Printemps and Fresnay the film still "hangs over anyone who dares revive the operetta on stage".

As well as theatre work covering 130 plays, he appeared in over 70 films, some still classics, and at the end of his life on television such as Le Neveu de Rameau.

In 1954, he published his memoirs, Je suis comédien (Eng. I am an actor). Fresnay continued to perform regularly in film and on stage through to the 1960s. In the 1970s, he appeared in a few films for television. From then on, he lived with the French actress and singer Yvonne Printemps for the rest of his life, co-directing the Théâtre de la Michodière in Paris with her until his death in 1975.

Death

He died of respiratory problems, aged 77, on 9 January 1975, at Neuilly-sur-Seine and he is interred alongside Printemps in the local cemetery. In his autobiography (My Name Escapes Me), Alec Guinness states that Fresnay was his favourite actor.

Other
Asked how to say his name, he told The Literary Digest "I think my name is to be pronounced fray-nay.  At least, it is the way I pronounce it." (Charles Earle Funk, What's the Name, Please?, Funk & Wagnalls, 1936).

Filmography

References

External links
 

1897 births
1975 deaths
Male actors from Paris
French male film actors
French male silent film actors
French male stage actors
Sociétaires of the Comédie-Française
French military personnel of World War I
Order of the Francisque recipients
Volpi Cup for Best Actor winners
20th-century French male actors
Burials at Neuilly-sur-Seine community cemetery